Sibu  (Hokchew Romanized: Sĭ-bŭ) is a landlocked city in the central region of Sarawak. It is the capital of Sibu District in Sibu Division, Sarawak, Malaysia. Sibu is mainly populated by people of Chinese descent, mainly from Fuzhou. Other ethnic groups such as Iban, Malay and Melanau are also present, but unlike other regions of Sarawak, they are not as significant. The cities population as of 2010 is 162,676.

Sibu was founded by James Brooke in 1862 when he built a fort in the town to fend off attacks by the indigenous Dayak people. Following this, a small group of Chinese Hokkien people settled around the fort to carry out business activities safely in the town. In 1901, Wong Nai Siong led a large scale migration of 1,118 Fuzhou Chinese people from Fujian, China into Sibu. The first hospital in Sibu, as well as the Sibu bazaars, were built by the Brooke government. The Lau King Howe Hospital and a number of Methodist schools and churches were built in the 1930s. However, the town of Sibu was burnt to the ground twice, in 1889 and in 1928, but it was rebuilt after that. During the Japanese occupation of Sarawak, the Japanese installed a new Resident in Sibu in June 1942 and Sibu was renamed to "Sibu-shu" in August 1942. After the Japanese surrender in 1945, Sarawak was ceded to the British as a Crown Colony. This had caused dissatisfaction amongst young Melanau people in Sibu who were pro-independence. As a result, the second British Governor of Sarawak, Sir Duncan George Stewart, was assassinated by Rosli Dhoby when he visited Sibu in December 1949. Rosli was later hanged to death at Kuching Central Prison in 1950. Sibu and the Rajang basin also became the centre of communist activities from 1950, which continued even after the Sarawak independence in 1963. A Rajang Security Command (RASCOM) was then established to curb communist activities in the area. Communist insurgency in Sarawak was significantly impaired in 1973 and later ended in 1990. Sibu was upgraded to municipality status in 1981. The city received a royal visit in September 2001. The city is also a gateway to the Sarawak Corridor of Renewable Energy (SCORE) since 2008. In 2011, the 110th anniversary of Fuzhou settlement was celebrated in Sibu.

Sibu is the main tourist gateway to the Upper Rajang River, with its small riverine towns and its many Iban and Orang Ulu longhouses. Among notable landmarks in Sibu are Wisma Sanyan, the tallest building in Sarawak, Lanang Bridge (one of the longest river bridges in Sarawak) and the biggest town square in Malaysia, near Wisma Sanyan. The Lau King Howe Hospital Memorial Museum is the first and the only medical museum in Malaysia. Sibu Central Market is the biggest indoor market in Sarawak. Some tourists attractions in Sibu are the Sibu Heritage Centre, Tua Pek Kong Temple, Bawang Assan longhouses, Sibu Old Mosque, Jade Dragon Temple, Bukit Aup Jubilee Park, Bukit Lima Forest Park, Sibu Night Market, Borneo Cultural Festival (BCF), and Sibu International Dance Festival (SIDF). Timber and shipbuilding industries are the two major economic activities in Sibu.

Etymology
Before 1873, Sibu was called "Maling", which was named after a bend of the Rajang river called "Tanjung Maling" opposite the present day town of Sibu near the confluence of Igan and Rajang rivers. On 1 June 1873, the third division of Sarawak (present day Sibu Division) was created under the Brooke administration. The division was later named after the native Pulasan fruit which can be found abundantly at the region ("Pulasan" is known as "Buah Sibau" in the Iban language).

History

Bruneian Empire
In the 15th century, the Malays living in southern Sarawak displaced the immigrant Iban people towards the present-day Sibu region. Throughout the 17th and 18th centuries, the Rajang basin was rife with tribal wars between the Ibans and indigenous people in the Rajang basin. The Ibans would occasionally form a loose alliance with the Malays to attack the Kayan tribes and perform raids on Chinese and Indonesian ships passing through the region.

Kingdom of Sarawak (Brooke administration)

James Brooke began his rule of Sarawak (present day Kuching) in 1841 after he obtained the territory from the Bruneian Empire. In 1853, Sarawak has expanded its territory to include the Sibu region. Sibu was a small village with several shop-houses. Such shophouses were built with atap roofs with wooden walls and floors. The earliest inhabitants of Sibu were the Melanau people, followed by the Iban and Malay people in the 1850s. Sibu Fort (Fort Brooke), which was built by Rajah Brooke in 1862, was located at the present day Channel Road in Sibu. It served as an administrative centre for the Brooke government in Sibu. However, it was demolished in 1936. It was common for the White Rajah to build such forts to stake his territorial claim as well as means of protection.
The existence of Sibu Fort is proven by historical writings:

On 13 May 1870, the fort was attacked by 3,000 Kanowit Dayaks under the leadership of a Dayak chief named Lintong (Mua-ri). The Dayaks tried to cut through the door of the fort by using axes but they were later defeated by the Brooke administration.  According to Sarawak Gazette, on 24 January 1871, there were 60 wooden shops in Sibu. In 1873, the third division of Sarawak was created which included the town of Sibu.

The first Chinese arrival in Sibu was in the 1860s. A group of Hokkien people built two rows of 40 shophouses around Sibu Fort (Fort Brooke). The Hokkien Chinese were a minority at that time, mostly consisting of Kekhs and Min Nan people who were doing business. A small number of Chiang Chuan and Amoy people later arrived at Sibu mostly due to commercial interests. By 1893, Munan Anak Minggat and his followers arrived in Sibu. They built a longhouse at Pulau Kerto, an island at the bend of Rajang River opposite Sibu near the Rajang and Igan rivers. He was a loyal war-leader to the Brooke government and helped to quash Iban rebellions around Upper Katibas and Lupar rivers in the 1860s and 1880s. In 1903, he was the first Iban to operate a rubber plantation in Kuching. He later invested the profits of his rubber plantation to shop-houses and lands in Sibu.

On 10 February 1889, the town of Sibu was burnt to the ground, which caused a developmental delay. The first hospital in Sibu was built by the Brooke government in 1912. It was a wooden single-storey building measuring 50 to 60 feet long, with an outpatient department, male and female wards. On 8 March 1928, Sibu was again consumed by a great fire. However, the Tua Pek Kong Temple remained intact. The locals considered this a miracle.

Fuzhounese settlement

Wong Nai Siong, a Christian scholar from Gutian County, Fujian, China, learnt about Sarawak and the White Rajahs through his son-in-law, Dr Lim Boon Keng. Disillusioned with the Qing Dynasty's heavyhanded approach against the Boxer Rebellion, where Chinese Christians were specially targeted for murder, Wong decided to search for a new settlement overseas, focusing on areas in South East Asia. Before arriving in Sarawak, Wong had looked for other areas in Malaya and Indonesia to settle, albeit unsuccessfully.

Wong got an approval from Charles Brooke to look for a new settlement in the Rajang basin. In April 1900, Wong travelled 13 days up the Rajang River before he decided to choose Sibu as the new settlement for his Fuzhounese clansmen, due to the area near Rajang delta being suitable for growing crops. An agreement was signed on 9 July 1900 between Wong Nai Siong and the Brooke government in Kuching to allow Chinese settlers into the area.

On 21 January 1901, the first batch of 72 settlers arrived at Sibu and settled at the Sungai Merah area from Fuzhou, Fujian, about 6 km from the town of Sibu. On 16 March 1901, the second batch of 535 settlers arrived - the day that they settled is now known as "New Fuzhou Resettlement Day". In June 1901, a final batch of 511 settlers arrived in Sibu, which brought the total number of Fuzhounese settlers to 1,118. Wong Nai Siong was appointed as "Kang Choo" (港主, "port master") for the Fuzhounese settlement in Sibu. The settlers planted sweet potatoes, fruits, sugar cane, vegetables, and coarse grains at high grounds and rice in wetlands. Following their work in Sibu, most settlers choose to stay and called the place their new home. Together with an American pastor, Reverend James Matthew Hoover, Wong became involved in the building of schools and churches in Sibu, including the Methodist church in 1902 and Ying Hua Methodist school at Sungai Merah in 1903. From 1903 to 1935, James Hoover helped to build 41 churches and 40 schools in Sibu. Between 1902 and 1917, 676 Cantonese people arrived in Sibu.

In 1904, Wong opposed the sale of opium and the building of a casino in the Sibu area, proposed by the Brooke government. He was later expelled by the Sarawak government due to a failure to repay debt. Wong and his family left Sibu in July 1904. Rev. James Hoover took over Wong's role of managing the Sibu settlement and introduced the first rubber seedlings to Sibu in 1904. He built a Methodist church in 1905, which was later renamed to Masland Methodist church in 1925. Hoover stayed at the Rajang basin for another 31 years until his death from malaria in 1935 at the Kuching General Hospital. The construction of Lau King Howe Hospital was completed in 1936 to accommodate the growing population of Sibu. The hospital served the people of Sibu for 58 years until 1994 when a new hospital was constructed in Sibu.

By 1919, the influence of Chinese Civil War had spread to Sarawak when the Kuomintang set up its first branches in Sibu and Kuching. The Rajah at the time, Charles Brooke opposed such political activity by the local Chinese and had expelled several local Kuomintang leaders. However, his son, Charles Vyner Brooke, was more receptive of such activities by the local Chinese people, who had also participated in a donation drive to aid the Kuomintang in its fight against Japanese invasion on the Chinese mainland. After World War II ended, local Kuomintang leaders supported the cessation of Sarawak to the British as a Crown Colony, which was met with opposition from the local communist leaders. Clashes between the communists and Kuomintang supporters were common. The Kuomintang branches in Sarawak were finally dissolved in 1949 when the party lost the Chinese Civil War to the Communist Party and retreated to Taiwan. However, clashes between the two sides continued until 1955 when the Kuomintang's newspaper was banned by the colonial British government in May 1951; while the communists' newspaper ceased to exist in 1955 due to financial difficulties.

Japanese occupation

Japanese forces first landed in Miri on 16 December 1941, and conquered Kuching on 24 December. On 25 December, Sibu was bombed by 9 Japanese warplanes flown from Kuching. The Resident of the Third Division, Andrew MacPherson, believed that the Japanese would start to invade Sibu following the air attack. He and his officer later fled Sibu to the upstream of Rajang River. They planned to pass through Batang Ai and trek through the forests to reach Dutch Borneo. However, they were caught and killed by the Japanese at Ulu Moyan, Sarawak.

In the evening of 26 December 1941, Sibu people started to ransack an unguarded government rice storeroom. Some villagers staying along the Rajang River also came to steal for daily necessities. The situation soon got out of control. British Sime Darby company, Borneo Company Limited, and Chinese businessmen became the victims of the riots. The Chinese businessman decided to form a security alliance to calm down the chaos. On 29 January 1942, a Japanese advance team was invited from Kuching to restore order in Sibu, who then later fled from Sibu back to Kuching. The power vacuum continued to exist in the third division until 23 June 1942, when the Japanese headquarters in Kuching sent Senda Nijiro to become the new Resident of the Third Division of Sarawak. After he took office, he immediately declared that Imperial Japanese Army would take total control of people's lives and property. On 8 August 1942, Sibu was renamed to "Sibu-shu".

The Japanese started to impose expensive taxes on Chinese people. They also started a Sook Ching operation on suspected anti-Japanese individuals. Under extreme torture, some Chinese individuals gave a false list of names of anti-Japanese groups. These lists would later lead to the death of innocent individuals at the Bukit Lima execution ground, while some individuals were sent to a prison at Kapit.

British Crown Colony

After the Japanese occupation of Sarawak ended in 1945, the last Rajah of Sarawak, Charles Vyner Brooke, decided to cede the state as part of the British crown colony of Sarawak. This proposal was met with fierce opposition from the locals, which later developed into the anti-cession movement of Sarawak. Rosli Dhobi was a Sarawak nationalist from Sibu and a member of the Malay Youth Movement (Gerakan Pemuda Melayu), where the main objective of the movement was to achieve Sarawak independence from British rule. At the age of 17, he assassinated Sir Duncan George Stewart, the second governor of colonial Sarawak on 3 December 1949. He and three of his accomplices (Awang Ramli Amit, Bujang Suntong, and Morshidi Sidek) were then sentenced to death by hanging and were buried at the Kuching Central Prison on 2 March 1950.

His remains was moved from the Kuching Central Prison and buried at the Sarawak Heroes Mausoleum near Sibu Town Mosque on 2 March 1996. To honour his involvement in the anti-colonial movement against the British, he and his associates who were involved in the assassination were later given a full state funeral by Sarawak state government.

Communist insurgency

Encouraged by the establishment of People's Republic of China in 1949, Sibu communist members started to establish themselves in Sarawak in the early 1950s. Huang Sheng Zi (黄声梓) from Bintangor became the president of Borneo Communist Party (BCP). BCP activities mostly concentrated in Sibu, Sarikei, and Bintangor. His brother, Huang Zeng Ting (黄增霆), who was also a communist, played an important role in the formation of first political party in Sarawak, Sarawak United Peoples' Party (SUPP) and became the party's first executive secretary. Sarawak Liberation League (SLL) was formed in 1954 following the consolidation of BCP with several other communist organisations.

The expansion of communism in Sibu relied heavily on student movements in several schools such as Chung Hua Secondary School (中华中学), Catholic High school (公教中学), and Wong Nai Siong High School (黄乃裳中学). Some of the communist strong points in Sibu were at Oya road and Queensway (now Jalan Tun Abang Haji Openg). The movement was also supported by the intelligentsia and workers in Sibu. For example, Dr Wong Soon Kai supported the movement by supplying free medication. Kampung Tanjung Kunyit villagers were among those being harassed into providing food and medical supplies to the communists. On 30 March 1971, the communists launched an anti-porn movement. In early 1973, they launched another campaign which opposed tax increase and inflation of prices while endorsing an increase in workers' wages. Some of the communist volunteers would start to distribute pamphlets at shophouses, schools, and the wharf terminal. The group also started military operation against police stations and naval bases. Communist guerillas would behead anyone who was suspected of being a government informant. The town was put under on-and-off 24-hour curfews for several months.

On 25 March 1973, the Sarawak government, led by chief minister Abdul Rahman Ya'kub started to clamp down on communist activities at the Rajang basin by setting up "Rajang Special Security Area". A day later, Rajang Security Command (RASCOM) was formed as a result of co-operation of civil, military, and police command headquarters. By August 1973, several communist members were captured by the government. The captured members provided crucial details for the government to further impair the communist movement. On 22 September 1973, Abdul Rahman started "Operation Judas". A total of 29 people from the town of Sibu were captured. Among those captured were doctors, lawyers, businessmen, teachers, and one former member of parliament. Following the surrender of a communist movement in Sri Aman on 21 October 1973, the communist activities at Rajang basin began to subside and would not be able to recover to its previous strength. Communist movement of Sarawak finally ended in 1990.

Recent developments

On 1 November 1981, the local council which administered the town of Sibu (Sibu Urban District Council) was upgraded to Sibu Municipal Council. The area of administration of Sibu expanded from 50 km2 to 129.5 km2. In 1994, Sibu Airport and Sibu Hospital were constructed. In 2001, Wisma Sanyan construction was completed. Yang di-Pertuan Agong of Malaysia, Sultan Salahuddin Abdul Aziz Shah visited Sibu from 16 to 17 September 2001 to close a month-long Malaysian Independence Day Celebration at Sibu Town Square.

Between 1999 and 2004, Sibu Municipal Council decided to adopt the swan as a symbol of Sibu to inspire the people to work towards the goal of becoming a city in the future. Since then, a Swan statue has been erected near the Sibu wharf terminal and another statue is located in the town centre. Sibu is also nicknamed as "Swan City". This came from a legend where famine in Sibu ended when a flock of swans flew through the skies of Sibu. There is another story where the Sibu Chinese immigrants regarded Sibu Melanau people as "Go" people because a staple food of Melanau staple food was "Sago".

In 2006, the Lanang Bridge connecting Sibu to Sarikei was opened. Sibu also functions as the gateway to Sarawak Corridor of Renewable Energy (SCORE). The town of Sibu and its surrounding areas has been the subject of several developmental projects since 2008. In 2011, the 110th anniversary of Fuzhou settlement was celebrated in Sibu. However, Sibu's population growth and economic development is relatively slow when compared to Miri and Bintulu.

Government

Sibu has two members of parliament representing the two parliamentary constituencies of the town: Lanang (constituency no: P.211) and Sibu (constituency no: P.212). The town also elects five representatives into the Sarawak State Assembly: Bukit Assek, Dudong, Bawang Assan, Pelawan, and Nangka.

Local authorities
A local council was first set up in Sibu on 31 January 1925 during the era of Brooke administration. It was later upgraded to Sibu Urban District Council (SUDC) in 1952.  After 29 years of administration, SUDC was upgraded to Sibu Municipal Council (SMC) on 1 November 1981. SMC administers the town with a jurisdiction area of 129.5 km2 from the banks of Rajang River to Salim road uptown. SUDC and SMC headquarters were housed inside the Sibu Town Hall for 38 years from 1962 to 2000. SMC headquarters was later relocated to Wisma Sanyan in 2001. The chairman of SMC is Tiong Thai King. The outskirts of Sibu such as Sibu Jaya and Selangau District are administered by Sibu Rural District Council (SRDC) covering a total area of 6,000 km2. SRDC headquarters is also located inside the Wisma Sanyan tower.

Sibu Islamic Complex opened in September 2014. It houses Sibu Resident Office, Sibu District Office, State Treasury Office, Social Welfare Department, and State Islamic Religious Department (JAIS).

International relations

As of 2015, Sibu is twinned to fifteen places in China:

Geography
Sibu is located near the Rajang delta at the confluence of Rajang and Igan rivers. Peat swamp forests and alluvial plains are particularly prevalent in the Sibu Division. Sibu is located on a deep peat soil, which has caused problems in infrastructure development because buildings and roads slowly sink into the ground after its completion. The location of Sibu in lowland peat swamps have subjected it to frequent floods, about 1 to 3 times per year. Because of these factors, the Sibu Flood Mitigation project was started to relieve the area from the floods. The highest elevation in Sibu is at Bukit Aup Jubilee Park, measuring 59 m above sea level.

Climate
Sibu has a tropical rainforest climate according to the Köppen climate classification. Sibu receives between 4 and 5 hours of sunlight per day with yearly average daily values of global solar radiation of 15.2 MJ/m2. Cloud cover over Sibu reduces during the months of June and July (6.75 Oktas) but increases from November to February (7 Oktas).

Demographics

The change in Sibu's population since 1947 is shown below:
{| class="wikitable" style="text-align: center;"
! Year
| 1947 || 1960 ||1970 || 1980 || 1991 || 2000 || 2010
|-
! Totalpopulation
| 9,983 || 29,630 || 49,298 || 85,231 || 133,479 || 166,322 || 162,676
|-
|}

Ethnicity
According to the 2010 Malaysian census, the town of Sibu (excluding suburban area) has total population of 162,676. Chinese (52.1%, 82,019) is the largest ethnic group in the town, followed by indigenous people (35.01%, 56,949), non-Malaysians (1.99%, 3,236), and Indians (0.37%, 598). Among the indigenous tribes, there are Iban (28,777), Malays (24,646), Melanau (16,028), Bidayuh (3,337), and other indigenous tribes (1874). A majority of the non-Malaysians are Indonesian workers employed at plywood and sawmills factories. There are also a number of illegal workers employed by syndicates to tap rubber. A number of foreign Chinese nationals and Indonesians are also working in massage parlours.

Languages
Since the majority of the town population is made up of Fuzhounese, Hokkien and Hakka Chinese, Mandarin Chinese being the lingua franca of all three dialect groups and usage of dialects such as the Fuzhou dialect, Hakka and Hokkien are commonly spoken amongst the Chinese community. The majority of Sibu Chinese are multilingual and are able to speak both Sarawak Malay and English. Indigenous languages such as Sarawak Malay, Melanau, Bidayuh and Iban are also spoken.

Religion
Unlike the other towns in Malaysia, the majority of the Chinese population in Sibu are Christians while other Chinese practice Buddhism, Taoism, and Confucianism. Some of the Iban in Sibu are Christians. Malays and Melanaus are Muslims. Respective religious groups are free to hold their processions in the town. Several notable religious buildings in the town are Sacred Heart Cathedral, Masland Methodist Church, Tua Pek Kong Temple, and An-Nur Mosque. Yu Lung San Tien En Si or Jade Dragon Temple is located at KM26 Sibu-Bintulu Road. The temple combined Buddhism, Taoism and Confucianism under one roof. It is claimed to be the largest temple in South East Asia.

Economy

In the early days, Fuzhounese settlers in Sibu tried to convert the town into a rice cultivation centre. However, this vision did not materialise because the soil was not suitable for rice cultivation. In August 1909, Charles Brooke agreed to grant land titles to Sibu Chinese farmers and encouraged them to cultivate rubber plantations. The rise of rubber prices from 1909 to 1911 had encouraged another 2,000 Fuzhounese settlers to come to Sibu. The demand for rubber rose again during Korean War between 1950 and 1953 and has benefited Sibu rubber plantations. Local farmers later used the profits from rubber plantations into setting up shops at Sungai Merah and Durin bazaars and involve in more profitable timber industry. During the Sarawak Communist Insurgency in the 1970s, rural farmers had to abandon their rubber plantations because of martial law declared by the state government which forbade them for helping the communists operating in the jungles.

The timber industry in Sibu flourished during the 1940s and 1950s and its economic importance surpassed rubber plantations in the 1960s. Several global timber conglomerates such as the Rimbunan Hijau Group, Ta Ann Holdings Berhad, Sanyan Group, WTK, The Sarawak Company, and Asia Plywood Company set up their headquarters in Sibu. Timber processing and exports become the main economic driving force in Sibu. Development of the timber industry in Sibu has been supported by loans given by the earliest Chinese banks in Sibu such as Wah Tat Bank (1929), Hock Hua Bank (1952), and Kong Ming Bank (1965). Following the introduction of "Banking and Financial Institutions Act of 1989" (BAFIA) by the Malaysian federal government, Kong Ming Bank was acquired by EON Bank in 1992, followed by the merger of Wah Tat Bank with Hong Leong Bank and the merger of Hock Hua Bank with Public Bank Berhad in the year 2000. In 1958, HSBC started its banking operation in Kuching, followed by Sibu in 1959. It was responsible for supporting several timber conglomerates in Sibu such as WTK and Ta Ann Holdings Berhad. In November 2013, HSBC decided to close down all its commercial banking sectors in Sarawak after the bank was alleged for supporting non-sustainable logging operations in Sarawak.

Shipbuilding business in Sibu started in the 1930s to supply wooden boats for river and coastal navigation. It flourished in 1970s and 1980s along with increase in exports of tropical timber from Sarawak. It later shifted its focus into steel boat building. Some of the vessels in demand are tug boats for towing logs, barges for carrying logs, anchor handlers, Offshore Support Vessels (OSV), ferries, and express boats for carrying passengers. Most of the boats built are of small and medium in size. There are a total of 40 shipyards in Sibu. A majority of the workers are welders. In 2003, 17 of the shipyards were relocated to Rantau Panjang Integrated Shipyard Shipbuilding Industrial Zone, Sibu. This included Yong Chin Kui, Far East, and TuongAik. The boats built in Sibu are often exported to neighbouring state of Sabah, Peninsular Malaysia, Singapore, Indonesia and United Arab Emirates. In the year 1991, a total of US$50 million was earned for shipbuilding business in Sibu. In 2011, Sibu ship exports stood at RM 525 million. Sibu is also the only city in Sarawak to possess a vehicle assembly plant. The plant is operated by N.B. Heavy Industries Sdn. Bhd., and it has been assembling Ankai, BeiBen, Golden Dragon, Huanghai Bus and JAC commercial vehicles since 2010. Sibu has two industrial areas: Upper Lanang Industrial estate (Mixed Light Industries) and Rantau Panjang Ship Building Industrial Zone.

There are two river ports at Sibu: Sibu port and Sungai Merah port, located at 113 km and 116 km along from the mouth of the Rajang river, respectively. Sibu port has maximum gross tonnage (GT) of 10,000 tonnes while Sungai Merah port has a maximum GT of 2,500 tonnes. Sibu port is used mainly for handling timber and agricultural products while Sungai Merah port is used for handling fuel oil products. Rajang Port Authority (RPA) is located at Sibu port operation centre. RPA has earned a total revenue of RM 30.1 million for the financial year of 2012.

Transport

Land
Roads in Sibu are under the jurisdiction of Sibu Municipal Council (SMC). Some of the notable roads in Sibu are Brooke Drive, Archer Street, and Wong Nai Siong Street. Kwong Ann roundabout is located near Brooke Drive in town centre while Bukit Lima roundabout is located near Wong King Huo Street in the uptown area. Sibu is also connected to other major towns and cities in Sarawak such as Kuching by Pan Borneo Highway. In early 2011, Sibu-Tanjung Manis Highway was opened. In April 2006, Lanang Bridge connecting Sibu to Sarikei and Bintangor across the Rajang River was opened. Toll-free Durin Bridge was opened in October 2006 connecting Sibu to other places such as Julau. The Durin bridge is located near the satellite township of Sibu Jaya.

Public transport

Local Bus

Local Bus or Bus Express remain unclear

The town of Sibu has two bus stations. The local bus station is located at the waterfront near the Sibu wharf terminal. The long-distance bus station is located at Pahlawan Street, near the Sungai Antu region. Jaya Li Hua Commercial Centre and Medan Hotel are located next to the long-distance bus station. The local bus station at the waterfront serves the town area, Sibu Airport, Sibu Jaya, Kanowit, and Sarikei. Lanang Bus serves the connection between the local bus station and the long-distance bus station while Panduan Hemat buses serves Sibu Airport and satellite township of Sibu Jaya. On the other hand, the long-distance bus station serves Kuching, Bintulu, and Miri via the Pan Borneo Highway. Some of the buses serving at the long-distance bus station are Biaramas, Suria Bus, and Borneo Highway Express.

Taxis in Sibu operates 24 hours a day. Taxis can be found at the airport, big hotels, taxi stands at the wharf terminal, and at Lintang Street. Taxi services are also offered for travel to nearby regions such as Mukah, Bawang Assan, Sarikei, and Bintangor. Kong Teck car rental is available at the airport.

In May 2017, ride-sharing service company GrabCar was launched in Sibu.

Water

Sibu wharf terminal is located at Kho Peng Long Street near the Rajang river waterfront. It provides an alternative means of transport for the people living along the Rajang River. Among the destinations that can be reached by express boats from Sibu includes Belaga, Dalat, Daro, Kapit, Kanowit, Kuching, Sarikei, and Song. Sibu floating market which is made up of several large boats can also be seen from the wharf terminal. The boats are responsible to carry groceries to rural communities living along the river and do not have access to roads. There used to be a Pandaw River Cruise which operated along the Rajang River from Sibu to Pelagus Rapids Resort but its operation was terminated in 2012 due to logistical and operational difficulties.

Air

Sibu Airport was built in 1994, located at 25 km from the town of Sibu and 1 km from the satellite township of Sibu Jaya. In 2008, the airport handled 831,772 passengers on 14,672 flights and 735 metric tonnes of cargo. In April 2010, the airport was allocated RM130 million by the Malaysian federal government for the upgrade of the terminal building. The airport terminal building is the second largest in Sarawak after the Kuching International Airport. The airport has a 2.75 km runway and it serves Malaysia Airlines, Air Asia, and MASWings with direct flights to all major towns in Sarawak, such as Miri, Bintulu, Kuching and national destinations such as Kota Kinabalu, Kuala Lumpur, and Johor Bahru. In October 2011, Firefly airline terminated its services in Sarawak while Malindo Air terminated its services to Sibu Airport in June 2014 due to low number of passengers.

Other utilities

Courts of law, legal enforcement, and crime

The court complex is located at Tun Abang Haji Openg Street, Sibu. It contains the High Court, Sessions Court, and the Magistrate Court. The Sibu town also has a Syariah Court located at Kampung Nyabor Street with jurisdictions in Sibu, Kanowit and Selangau districts. There is one district police headquarters at Tun Abang Haji Openg Street. The Sibu central police station is located at Kampung Nyabor Street. Sungai Merah police station and Lanang police station are also located in Sibu town area. There is also a prison in Sibu.

Tiong King Sing, an MP from Bintulu, has voiced concerns about gangsterism in Sarawak especially the Sibu town back in 2007. As a result, "Operation Cantas Kenyalang" was started in 2008 to clamp down gangsterism in Sarawak. In September 2013, Sibu police chief announced that "Lee Long", "Sungai Merah", and "Tua Chak Lee" gangs ceased to exist and Sibu town is free from organised gangsterism. There were 25 gangster groups in Sibu back in 2007; there are 7 groups as of 9 October 2013. In September 2014, Royal Malaysian Police headquarter at Bukit Aman, Kuala Lumpur, stated that 16 local gangster groups are still active in Sarawak especially in Sibu but they do not pose any serious security threats. This raised new concerns that such groups still pose a serious security risk in Sibu town and Sarawak in general.

Healthcare

Sibu Hospital is the second largest hospital in Sarawak and the secondary referral hospital for the central region of Sarawak which includes 5 divisions: Sibu, Kapit, Mukah, Sarikei, and Betong. There are 8 district hospitals in these divisions that are referred to Sibu. Sibu Hospital is also a teaching hospital for undergraduates from Universiti Malaysia Sarawak (UNIMAS) and SEGi University. There are also two private medical centres in Sibu: KPJ Sibu Specialist Medical Centre and Rejang Medical Centre.

Lanang and Oya Polyclinics are located in Sibu. There are also five 1Malaysia clinics in Sibu. The Bandong 1Malaysia clinic became the first 1Malaysia Clinic nationwide to offer echocardiography screening.
There are also several pharmacy outlets in Sibu: B Y Chan pharmacy, Central Pharmacy, Lot 9 Pharmacy near by Delta Mall and Cosway Pharmacy.

Education

Sibu has about 85 primary schools and 23 secondary schools. The Sibu primary and secondary schools under the National Education System are managed by Sibu District Education Office located at Brooke Drive, Sibu. The oldest school in Sibu is Sacred Heart High School which was formed in 1902 by Rev. Father Hopfgarther. This was followed by Rev James Hoover where he formed Methodist Anglo-Chinese School in 1903. The school later evolved into Methodist primary and secondary schools in 1947. Uk Daik primary school, built in 1926, is one of the oldest Chinese primary schools in Sibu. Built in 1954, St Mary primary school is the oldest English stream school in Sibu Division. Sibu also has five Chinese independent schools. The most notable ones are Catholic High School (1961) and Wong Nai Siong High School (1967). All the Chinese independent schools in Sibu are under the purview of The United Association of Private Chinese Secondary School, Sibu Division. In 2013, Woodlands International School opened in Sibu offering Cambridge International Examinations (CIE) course.

In 1997, United College Sarawak (UCS) was established in Sibu at Teku Street. It was renamed to Kolej Laila Taib (KLT) in 2010. This college offers business, accounting, civil engineering, architecture, Electrical and Electronic Engineering and quantity surveying courses. University College of Technology Sarawak (UCTS), located just opposite the KLT, commenced its maiden intake of new undergraduate students in September 2013. This university is established to provide human capital for the development of Sarawak Corridor of Renewable Energy (SCORE). In 1967, Pilley Memorial Secondary School was established in Sibu. In April 1991, the school was upgraded to Methodist Pilley Institute (MPI) and it started to offer accounting, business management, and computer science courses.

Sarawak Maritime Academy was formed under the Shin Yang Group of Companies. It offers Diploma in Nautical (DNS) and Diploma in Marine Engineering courses. Sacred Heart College started to offer Diploma in Hotel Management courses in 2010. Rimbunan Hijau (RH) Academy was established in 2005 and it started to offer training in automotive, oil palm plantations, hospitality, and business management in 2007. Sibu Nursing College and ITA college offers nursing-related programmes. In 1954, the Methodist Theological School was established in Sibu. It is affiliated with Methodist Church in Malaysia and is accredited by the Association for Theological Education in South East Asia (ATESEA).

Long distance study centres (Pendidikan Jarak Jauh, PJJ) in Sibu are opened by Universiti Utara Malaysia (UUM) at Lanang and Universiti Putra Malaysia (UPM) at Sibu Jaya. Universiti Malaysia Sarawak (UNIMAS) opened its Centre for Academic Information Services (CAIS) - Integrated Learning Facilities (ILF) at Sibu for undergraduate medical students undergoing their training at Sibu Hospital. Open University Malaysia (OUM) also opens a Sibu Learning Centre.
SEGi University has established its Clinical Campus in Sibu Hospital in 2014. This campus houses its Faculty of Medicine which offers a 5-year programme leading to a Bachelor of Medicine and Surgery (MBBS). The first 2 years of the programme is conducted at the main SEGi University Campus in Kota Damansara. Located in the Sibu Hospital complex Sibu Clinical Campus offers clinical training for the Third, Fourth and Final Year students.Besides Sibu Hospital clinical training are also conducted at Sarikei Hospital, government clinics and selected private clinics.

Libraries

The first public library in Sibu was started as Methodist Missionary Library in the 1950s. It was taken over by Sibu Urban District Council (SUDC) in 1955. It was moved to the present location at Keranji road in 1986 as SMC public library. The library underwent a major upgrade in 2014. Another public library named "Ling Zi Ming Cultural centre" (林子明文化館) was established by the local Chinese community under the Sibu Chinese Chamber of Commerce and Industry (SCCCI, 詩巫中華總商會) in 1980. It houses Chinese books collections. Another library named Sibu Jaya public library is located at the satellite township of Sibu Jaya, 26 km from the town of Sibu.

Culture and leisure

Attractions and recreational spots

Cultural

Since 2005, Borneo Cultural Festival (BCF) is held by Sibu Municipal Council (SMC) in July every year at Sibu Town Square, for a period of 10 days. It is a celebration of traditional music, dances, contests, beauty pageant, food stalls, fun fairs, and product exhibitions. There are 3 separate stages for Iban, Chinese, and Malay performances. It draws around 20,000 people every year. BCF was stopped briefly in 2011 before it was resumed in 2012. Sibu has hosted the National Chinese Cultural Festival (全國華人文化節) twice: in 2001 (18th Festival) and 2009 (26th Festival) which lasted for 3 days. Among the activities organised during this festival were cultural village (a venue designated to showcase cultural heritages from various ethnicity), lantern riddles, cultural dances, Chinese songs, dragon dances, and Chinese calligraphy. Sibu International Dance Festival (SIDF) was started in 2012. It is usually held between June to September every year, which lasted for 5 days. It attracted around 14 to 18 international dance troupes for performances in Sibu. It includes activities such as workshops, conferences, outdoor performances, and a dance concert.

There are 9 Bawang Assan Iban longhouses which are 40 minutes away from the town of Sibu. The longhouses can be dated back from 18th century traditional longhouses to present day modern longhouses. Visitors can enjoy traditional rice wine tuak and other delicacies such as sarang semut, kain kebat, and pansuh. These Iban longhouses showcase their lifestyles, customs, traditional dance, and music. Homestays are also available at these longhouses. There are 3 ceramic factories in Sibu. Ceramic designs mainly depicts traditional culture of the natives.

Historical
Sibu Heritage Trail was launched in 2012 to include 9 landmarks in Sibu, which are: Sibu Heritage Centre, Sibu Old Mosque (Masjid Al-Qadim, built in 1883), Warriors Memorial Site (present burial site of Rosli Dhobi, near An-Nur Mosque), oldest Muslim cemetery, Lau King Howe Hospital Memorial Museum, Hoover Memorial Square, Tua Pek Kong Temple, and Sibu Central Market. All the 9 landmarks can be reached by 2 kilometres of walking distance from each other. Sibu Heritage Centre is housed in a former Sibu Town Hall. It displays the early beginnings of Sibu, Iban and Malay cultures, with Chinese porcelain and clay vases which can be dated back to the era of Imperial China. Tua Pek Kong Temple is a Buddhist and Taoist Temple which was established in 1870. The 7-storey Guanyin Pagoda (Goddess of Mercy) was built in the 1980s. The Lau King Howe Hospital Memorial Museum is the only medical museum in Malaysia. It displays dental, surgical, and obstetric services offered by the hospital from the 1950s to 1990s. Sungai Merah (Red River) Heritage Walk is the landmark of the earliest settlement of Fuzhounese in Sibu in 1901. There is a walking trail at the Sungai Merah river front leading up to Wong Nai Siong Memorial Garden. James Hoover Memorial Garden is also located near the Sungai Merah Heritage Walk.

Leisure and conservation areas

Bukit Aup Jubilee Park was opened in March 1993. It is located 10 km away from the town of Sibu. The park was the two consecutive winner of National Landscaping Competition Award in 1997 and 1998. The highest peak in the park, Bukit Aup (59 m above sea level) was originally a traditional burial ground for Iban warriors. The burial ground has since been relocated to a nearby village for the development of the park. However, the Iban community still regarded the peak as a sacred place and frequently brought offerings for the benevolent spirit named Nanga Bari.

Bukit Lima peat swamp forest reserve, covering , was gazetted as protected area since October 1929. In January 2001, Bukit Lima Forest Park covering  was constructed in the peat swamp forest and opened to the public. It has two separate trails of wooden planks of 3.5 km and 2.5 km long respectively. The park also has a 3-storey concrete watchtower for sightseeing. The park is managed by Sarawak Forestry Corporation (SFC).

Sibu has other urban and suburban parks such as Kutien Memorial Garden, Hin Hua Memorial Park, and Permai Lake Garden. The Kutien Memorial Garden located at Lanang Street is managed by Sibu Kutien Association. The Kutien Garden showcase the association's history and events. The Hin Hua Memorial Park is established by Sibu Heng Hua community where their earliest arrival in Sibu was in 1911. YMCA Camp Resort is located away from the town. It provides facilities for camping and retreat.

Sports

Sibu has three stadiums: Tun Zaidi Stadium, Sibu Indoor Stadium and Sibu Prudential Volleyball Association Stadium.

Sibu BASE jump is an annual event that is held in September every year since 2009, which lasts for 3 days. Night jumps are also performed if the weather is fair. The BASE jumping usually takes place from the top of Wisma Sanyan which is 126 m high and is the tallest building in Sarawak. The number of jumpers has increased from 11 jumpers in 2009 to 45 jumpers in 2014. In 2013, world's first tandem BASE jumping from a building (Wisma Sanyan in Sibu) was done by Sean Chuma (world-renowned BASE jumper), carrying Rudy Anoi (chief executive of Sarawak Tourism Board, Sibu branch) with him.

Since 2001, Sarawak Health Marathon is held every year at Bukit Aup Jubilee Park, Sibu. The run can be divided into 6 categories, including 21 km Men's and Ladies’ Open, 7 km Men's Fun Run and Boys’ Junior, 2.5 km Girls’ Junior, and 2.5 km Ladies Fun Run.

Other sights

Sibu Gateway is a landmark at the downtown area which includes an illuminated fountain, a garden, and a Swan statue surrounded by 12 Chinese zodiac signs. Rajang Esplanade is one of the 22 community parks in Sibu, mostly donated by Chinese clan associations. Rajang Esplanade has a walkway along the Rajang riverfront from Sibu wharf terminal to Kingwood Hotel with Hii's association playground along the way. It offers a scene of muddy river with timber barges, express boats, and fishing boats commuting on the river. Several mural paintings depicting historical lifestyles and local cuisines are found at various locations in Sibu.

Other events
Sibu Bike Week is an event that is held in December every year since 2011. It is a 3-day event aimed to bring all the enthusiasts of motorcyclists, cars, audio systems, BMX, Zumba, and paintball to share their hobbies and experiences. It has attracted about 2,000 bikers around the world. Among the activities held during Sibu Bike Week are Miss Sibu Bike Week Pageant, Tattoo queen and King competition. Borneo Talent Award (BTA) is held every year in Sibu since 2011 at Sibu Civic Centre. It showcases performances of singing, dancing, acrobatics, mimicry, playing musical instruments, magic show, and art performances.

Shopping

Sibu features a number of shopping malls: Wisma Sanyan, Medan Mall, Sing Kwong Shopping Complex, Farley Departmental Store, Delta Mall, Star Mega Mall, Everwin and Giant Hypermarket.

The Sibu Night Market was established in 1973. It was situated in the town centre. Local traders will usually set up their mobile stalls from 5 pm to 10 pm every day. The stalls offer household goods, footwear, fashion items, and varieties of food. In August 2012, the market was relocated to Butterfly Garden at Cross Road near the Tua Pek Kong Temple to ease traffic jams.

The Sibu Central Market is the largest indoor market in Malaysia. It is located at Channel Street, opposite the Sibu wharf terminal. The central market has food stalls on top floor with dry and wet market on the ground floor. Among the items on sale in this market are exotic fruits, jungle produce, handicrafts, Bario rice, and poultry. There are 1,100 stalls in the market on weekdays and 400-500 additional stalls on weekends when the indigenous people from the interior brought their jungle produce to the market.

Cuisine

The "Bandong walk" project was started in 2012 and was scheduled to be completed in 2015. This project is set to make the Bandong area a halal food hub of local delicacies for the locals and the tourists. Common dishes in Sibu include:
 Kam Pua  noodle (also known as 干盘面) — noodles tossed in pork lard or vegetable oil, fried shallots, spring onions and sometimes soy sauce and/or chili sauce. It is available at almost all coffee shops and food stalls. Halal kampua noodles are available.
 Duëng Mian Ngu (also known as 鼎边糊) — a savoury soup with soft rice cake is available at several stalls as a hefty breakfast or a late night supper. It is often served with fish balls and squid.
 Bian Nyuk (also known as 扁肉, 雲吞, or Wonton) — a meat dumpling which can be served dry or in a soup.
 Gom bian (also known as 光饼 or Kompia) — a Fuzhou delicacy made with flour, baked in an oven and eaten either with or without meat and gravy. It is somewhat similar to a bagel. However, it can be either in a crisp or soft version. Traditional soft kompia dipped in pork sauce can be sought from Chung Hua road and the Sunday Market at Pedada road. There are deep fried variations available throughout the town of Sibu.
 You Zhar Gui (also known as 油炸桧, 油條, Yau Char Kway, or Kueh Cakoi in Malay) — deep fried twin dough batter often dipped in soup or chili sauce. It is often eaten together with porridge or "Bak Kut Teh" （肉骨茶）.
 Bek Ding Yuok (also known as 八珍药 or Pek Ting Ngor): The soup of eight essences — Chinese soup containing at least eight herbal ingredients.
 Rojak Kassim — Indian-style rojak (also known as pasembur or Mamak Rojak).

Notable people

Politics
 Tun Pehin Sri Abang Muhammad Salahuddin Abang Barieng, 3rd and 6th Governor of Sarawak.
 Tun Datuk Patinggi Ahmad Zaidi Adruce, 5th Governor of Sarawak.
 Tun Datuk Patinggi Tuanku Bujang Tuanku Othman, 2nd Governor of Sarawak.
 YBhg. Tan Sri Dr. Wong Soon Kai, former Deputy Chief Minister of Sarawak and former President of Sarawak United People's Party (SUPP).
 Datuk Robert Lau Hoi Chew, former Member of Parliament for Sibu and former Malaysian Deputy Minister of Transport.
 Datuk Tiong Thai King, former Member of Parliament for Lanang and former chairman of Sibu Municipal Council (SMC).
 Wong Ho Leng, former Member of Parliament for Sibu, Sarawak State Legislative Member for Bukit Assek and former Chairman of Sarawak Democratic Action Party (DAP).
 YB Dato' Sri Fadillah Yusof, Deputy Prime Minister of Malaysia, and Minister of Plantation and Commodities since 2022. He is currently the member of Parliament for Petra Jaya, Kuching and former Senior Minister of Malaysia (Works).
 YBhg. Dato' Awang Bemee Awang Ali Basah, former Sarawak State Legislative Member for Nangka, Legal Adviser of Parti Pesaka Bumiputera Bersatu (PBB) Sarawak and Chairman of Kuching Port Authority.
 YBhg. Vincent Goh Chung Siong, former Sarawak State Legislative Member for Pelawan and Chairman of Rajang Port Authority.
 YB Dr. Annuar Rapaee, Assistant Minister for Education, Science and Technology Research & Assistant Minister for Housing and Public Health and Sarawak State Legislative Member for Nangka.

Business
 Tan Sri Datuk Sir Tiong Hiew King, Chairman of Rimbunan Hijau Group and elder brother of Datuk Tiong Thai King. He was listed as one of the 10 richest Malaysians and also one of the Malaysians receiving the knighthood from the British Government.
 Datuk Lau Hui Siong, Founder of See Hua Group which publishes See Hua Daily News, The Borneo Post, and Utusan Borneo.

Others
 Andrew Cheng, US-based musician. He has also been working on concerts with Hong Kong singers/actors William So, Fred Cheng and Stephanie Ho as well as Matt Sallee of Pentatonix, and Shereen Cheong of the Victory Boyd band.
 Edwin Ong Wee Kee, photographer who became the first Malaysian to win the grand prize of the 8th Hamdan International Photography Award (Hipa) in Dubai, United Arab Emirates (UAE).
 Gloria Ting Mei Ru, Miss Malaysia World 2004.
 Datuk Dr. Matnor Daim, former Director of Education, Malaysia and recipient of National Education Leadership 2011 Award in conjunction of National Level Teachers Day 2011 in Kuching.
 Ting Ming Siong, a food stall operator, known as the Guinness World Record Holder for the "Most weddings attended by a best man". He attended 1,393 weddings from September 1975 to 2 February 2006)

See also
 Roman Catholic Diocese of Sibu, a diocese of the Latin Church of the Roman Catholic Church in Malaysia
 Sibu by-election, 2010

References

Notes

External links
 
 

 
Ports and harbours of Malaysia
Populated places established in 1862
1862 establishments in Sarawak